Ongar is a civil parish in the Epping Forest District in Essex, England. Other than the town of Chipping Ongar it also includes Greensted, Greensted Green, Marden Ash and Shelley. The local council of the parish is Ongar Town Council. Located approximately 21 miles north-east of London, it is a partially developed parish with large sections of open land.

History
The name "Ongar" means "grass land". The parish was created in 1965 as an amalgamation of the Chipping Ongar, Greensted and Shelley civil parishes in the Epping and Ongar Rural District. In 1974 the parish became part of Epping Forest District.

Government
Ongar Town Council is the local authority for the civil parish. The parish council offices are located in Chipping Ongar.

Geography
The civil parish includes the following settlements:
Chipping Ongar
Greensted
Greensted Green
Marden Ash
Shelley

The shape of the parish is an inverted "L" running from Greensted in the west to Marden Ash to the east, then north to include Chipping Ongar and then Shelley. Ongar is a post town in the CM postcode area.

Demography
As at the 2001 census the population was 6,069 and 51.7% female. There are 2,494 households, with an average household size of 2.43. The population has decreased by 8% since 1991, the largest drop in the district.

Education
State education in Ongar is provided by Chipping Ongar Primary School (in Chipping Ongar), Ongar Primary School (in Shelley), and The Ongar Academy secondary school.

History
Ongar Grammar School was a private school for boys which was opened as a boarding school in 1811 by William Stokes M.A. By 1845 the school was known as 'Ongar Academy' (not in the post-2010 Academy school sense), by 1874 it was known as a private grammar school, by 1882 as Chignell Grammar School, and by 1914 as Chipping Ongar Grammar School. It closed as such in 1940, before the introduction of secondary education under the Education Act 1944 and the Tripartite System.

An earlier private school, which was endowed by a Mr Joseph King in 1678 and funded from rents on houses, was established for "educating, apprenticing and supplying with religious books the poor inhabitants of the parish". By 1882 this endowed school was listed as being for the education children of the Chipping Ongar and Shelley parishes, and had been reorganized in 1869 and  enlarged in 1873 to meet requirements of the Elementary Education Act 1870. By 1894 this school had widened its catchment to include Greensted, and by 1914 to include High Ongar, by which time it had become a Council School. In 1833 there had been seven day schools in Chipping Ongar, one of which was endowed, the others providing education through parent fees. There were also two boarding schools supported at the expense of parents, and two Sunday Schools; one supported by the Church of England, the other by Independent churches.

In 1936, Essex County Council had established the Ongar County Secondary School in a neo-Georgian building fronting Fyfield Road, Shelley. The school expanded in the 1960s when it became Ongar Comprehensive School, but was closed in 1989. Its buildings were demolished to make way for a new residential development and new youth and adult education centres. Ongar Leisure Centre, a joint use sporting facility, was retained. Secondary school children were then bussed to schools in the surrounding towns, particularly Brentwood and Shenfield. Twenty six years later in September 2015, the new secondary education school, The Ongar Academy, with no historic association to any previous Ongar school apart from being built on part of the site of the earlier Ongar County Secondary School in Shelley, opened adjacent to Ongar Leisure Centre on Fyfield Road.

Transport
Since the closure of the Central line between Epping and Chipping Ongar in 1994, there is no longer a daily commuter train service in the parish. The nearest London Underground service to the parish is Epping which is served by the Central line. The closest National Rail service is from Brentwood, which is served by the Great Eastern Main Line and is operated by TfL.

The former Ongar London Underground station now forms part of the heritage Epping Ongar Railway.

Radio
There was a shortwave transmitter at Ongar. See Marconi station and the Imperial Wireless Chain.

References

External links
 Ongar Town Council

Civil parishes in Essex
Epping Forest District
History of telecommunications in the United Kingdom